Luis Héctor Papandrea (born 8 August 1952) is an Argentine retired professional soccer player.

Playing career
Papandrea made his professional debut for Ferro Carril Oeste on March 26, 1972, at age 19. He would go on to make 118 appearances for the club. In 1976 he was loaned to Racing, where he played 25 games. After a return to Ferro in 1977, he received a free release on December 31, 1977.

In March 1978 he was invited to the United States for a two-week trial with the Tampa Bay Rowdies of the North American Soccer League. Rowdies’ coach Gordon Jago like what he saw and signed him after only six days. Papandrea made 15 appearances and 13 starts that season, helping Tampa Bay to Soccer Bowl '78.

Having been released from Tampa Bay in October after the season ended, he returned to Argentina, and joined First Division side Platense for three years. In 1982, he finished out his career with Central Norte.

Post-playing career
After retiring, Papandrea joined the coaching staff of Ferro. He later served as assessor for Estudiantes, and as the general coordinator for Los Cardales Club. Ultimately he returned to the United States, and has been coaching at the youth development level in Austin, Texas since 1993.

Personal life
Papandrea was born and raised in Buenos Aires, Argentina. He is of Greek and Italian heritage through his great-grandparents. His younger brother Ruben also played at Ferro. He and his wife Susana were married in 1973 and have three children. Papandrea stated in a 1978 interview that in Greek his last name means very manly.

Honors
North American Soccer League
Soccer Bowl '78: Finalist

References

External links
Carril Oeste stats

NASL stats

1952 births
Living people
Argentine people of Calabrian descent
Argentine people of Italian descent
Argentine people of Greek descent
Association football defenders
Argentine footballers
Argentine expatriate footballers
Argentine expatriate sportspeople in the United States
Footballers from Buenos Aires
Argentine Primera División players
Ferro Carril Oeste footballers
Racing Club de Avellaneda footballers
Club Atlético Platense footballers
North American Soccer League (1968–1984) players
North American Soccer League (1968–1984) indoor players
Tampa Bay Rowdies (1975–1993) players